Plebeia is a genus of mostly small-bodied stingless bees, formerly included in the genus Trigona. Most of the ~45 species are placed in the subgenus (Plebeia) (s.s.), but there also are four species in the subgenus (Scaura). They differ in only minor structural details, primarily of the hind leg, from other genera that were formerly treated as constituents of Trigona. In some classifications, the genus Schwarziana is treated as a subgenus within Plebeia, but recent morphological analyses indicate that Schwarziana is a distinct lineage, while Plebeia is paraphyletic.

Due to their small sizes, in Brazil many species are known as abelha-mirim (literally "small bee") in Portuguese.

Range 
Species of the genus Plebeia occur from Mexico to Argentina.

A few feral colonies of P. emerina exist in the United States, the result of experimental imports in the 1950s.

List of species 

 P. alvarengai  
 P. amydra 
 P. asthenes 
 P. aurantia  [Now placed in genus Plectoplebeia]
 P. catamarcensis  
 P. chondra 
 P. cora  
 P. deceptrix 
 P. domiciliorum  
 P. droryana  
 P. emerina  
 P. emerinoides  
 P. flavocincta  
 P. franki 
 P. frontalis 
 P. fulvopilosa 
 P. goeldiana 
 P. grapiuna 
 P. guazurary 
 P. hyperplastica 
 P. jatiformis 
 P. julianii 
 P. kerri 
 P. llorentei 
 P. lucii 
 P. malaris  
 P. manantlensis 
 P. margaritae 
 P. melanica 
 P. meridionalis 
 P. mexica 
 P. minima 
 P. molesta 
 P. mosquito 
 P. moureana  [Now placed in genus Asperplebeia]
 P. mutisi 
 P. nigriceps 
 P. nigrifacies  [Now placed in genus Plectoplebeia]
 P. orphne 
 P. parkeri 
 P. peruvicola 
 P. phrynostoma 
 P. plectoforma 
 P. pleres 
 P. poecilochroa 
 P. pulchra 
 P. remota 
 P. roubiki 
 P. saiqui 
 P. silveirai 
 P. tica  [Now placed in genus Asperplebeia]
 P. tigris 
 P. tobagoensis 
 P. variicolor 
 P. vidali 
 P. wittmanni

References

Meliponini
Bee genera